Daniel Benedict  Miller (born 2 January 1991) is an English actor. He is known for portraying the role of Aaron Livesy in the ITV soap opera Emmerdale, for which he has won the British Soap Award for Best Actor in 2011, 2012 and 2016. He won the twenty-first series of I'm a Celebrity...Get Me Out of Here!.

Career 
In 2007, at the age of 16, Miller made his television debut when he portrayed Kyle Brown in the BBC drama series Grange Hill. He appeared in 8 episodes. In 2008, Miller began portraying the role of Aaron Livesy on the ITV soap opera Emmerdale. In 2011, he announced that he was leaving Emmerdale and his last appearance would be in spring 2012.
On 22 October 2011, alongside his family, Miller appeared on the ITV game show All Star Family Fortunes. From December 2012 to January 2013, he starred as Prince Charming in the pantomime production of Cinderella at the Grand Theatre in Blackpool. Later in 2013, he appeared in the ITV drama Lightfields. In April 2014, Miller played William in the BBC production of Jamaica Inn. Miller joined the cast of Scott & Bailey, in late 2013, as series regular Rob Waddington. He appeared in the series until 2014.

In April 2014, Miller agreed to return to Emmerdale and reprised his role as Aaron Livesy later that year. His return scenes aired on 14 August 2014.

In November 2021, Miller was announced as a contestant on the twenty-first series of I'm a Celebrity...Get Me Out of Here!. He was announced winner of the series on 12 December.

Personal life 
In 2011, Miller co-founded the charity Once Upon a Smile with Daniel Jillings in memory of former Emmerdale producer Gavin Blyth. In January 2021, Miller got engaged to partner Steph Jones. The couple announced in May 2021 that they were expecting their first child. After being told they would be unlikely to conceive naturally, Miller explained that they were about to begin the IVF process, when they found out Steph was pregnant. The child's birth was announced on 27 October 2021.

Filmography

Awards and nominations 

Note: At the British Soap Awards, in categories such as Best Storyline, Best Single Episode and Spectacular Scene, the nomination is credited to the producers, writers or director.

References

External links 
 

1991 births
Living people
21st-century English male actors
Actors from Stockport
British male film actors
British male soap opera actors
British male stage actors
I'm a Celebrity...Get Me Out of Here! (British TV series) winners
People from Bredbury